William Cayley Hamilton  ( – October 2, 1901) was a Canadian barrister and politician. He was mayor of Regina, Saskatchewan in 1888. In 1898 he founded The Law Society of the Northwest Territories and became its first president.

References

1850s births
1901 deaths
Mayors of Regina, Saskatchewan
Canadian lawyers